The 2014–15 season is the club's 106th season, having been founded as Dundee Hibernian in 1909 and their second season in the Scottish Premiership. United will also compete in the League Cup and the Scottish Cup.

Results & fixtures

Pre season

Scottish Premiership

Scottish League Cup

Scottish Cup

Player statistics

Squad information

Disciplinary record

Team statistics

League table

Division summary

Management statistics
Last updated on 24 May 2015

Transfers

Players in

Players out

See also
List of Dundee United F.C. seasons

Notes

References

Dundee United
2014andndash;15